is a Japanese mathematician at Keio University. She specializes in transcendental numbers, and is known for her research related to the theory of Mahler functions and Painlevé transcendents. In 1996 she published the first comprehensive text on transcendence of Mahler functions, Mahler Functions and Transcendence, extending and generalizing Mahler's method. Her husband Keiji Nishioka is also a mathematician, and a coauthor.

References

20th-century Japanese mathematicians
21st-century Japanese mathematicians
Japanese women mathematicians
1954 births
Living people
20th-century women mathematicians
21st-century women mathematicians